"Hearts on Fire" is a song by American DJ and producer Illenium and Canadian producer Dabin featuring Canadian singer-songwriter Lights. It was released on December 25, 2020 via 12 Tone Music and Warner Records. The song was written by Illenium, Dabin, Lights, Taylor Dearman and produced by Illenium and Dabin.

Background
About the song, Dabin shared in Instagram: "Nick and I always talked about making something but we could never find the right moment. With both of us being stuck at home it was the perfect opportunity to start something together and we’re so happy with how this one turned out."

Content
The song told a story of difficult relationship filled with uncertainties, and the chorus pleaded for clarity, asked for a sign which the relationship was still strong.

Composition
The song merges melodic dubstep, rock and pop, and it features multi instrumentalist and producer Dabin strumming out guitar riffs along with Lights' vocals. This one is more of a slow burn that progresses along with heart-wrenching vocals and swelling synths and is punctuated with spurts of powerful guitar chords and drum crashes.

Music video
The music video premiered on January 14, 2021, directed by Caleb Mallery and produced visual effects by Nic Torres and Fractal VFX. Two separated lovers seek out each other once more. Sparks fly when the protagonists finally find each other in a room with an alluring, glowing orb as a mysterious figure reignites their flame.

Charts

Weekly charts

Year-end charts

References

2020 singles
2020 songs
Illenium songs
Lights (musician) songs
Songs written by Illenium
Songs written by Lights (musician)